The Pontifical Catholic University of Puerto Rico School of Law is the law school of the Pontifical Catholic University of Puerto Rico, a private Roman Catholic university with its main campus in Ponce, Puerto Rico. It was established in 1961.

History
It was the first private law school established in Puerto Rico. The law school is located in the Spellman Building and was founded in 1961 by Monsignor Fremiot Torres Oliver. The law school received the accreditation from the Puerto Rico Superior Education Council of Puerto Rico on 13 April 1964. The American Bar Association granted provisional accreditation on 13 April 1967, and final accreditation on August 1972. The Law School offers the course of study leading to the J.D. degree through a three-year full-time day and a four-year part-time evening programs. The law school admits students for its fall (August) and spring (January) sessions. It offers two Joint Degree Programs, the J.D./M.B.A. and J.D./M.P.A. with the University graduate programs.

The School of Law houses a major research library with a collection of about 207,095 volumes and extensive computer-assisted research capabilities including Lexis/Nexis, Westlaw, and MICROJURIS.COM with wireless access to the Internet from anywhere in the law school campus. It is the home of the Revista de Derecho Puertorriqueno which is a student and faculty edited law review published since 1961. The School of Law is noted for its Legal Service Clinic and Externship programs that offer to its students the opportunity to serve the community and the poor in need of legal services.

The law school has the most active national law student organizations in Puerto Rico, with local chapters of The Federalist Society, the American Bar Association, the Federal Bar Association and the American Association of Trial Lawyers.

The interim dean is Fernando Moreno Orama.

On May 15, 2020, the council of the American Bar Association’s Section of Legal Education and Admissions to the Bar met remotely and determined this school and nine others had significant noncompliance with Standard 316.  This Standard was revised in 2019 to provide that at least 75% of an accredited law school’s graduates who took a bar exam must pass one within two years of graduation.  The school was asked to submit a report by Feb. 1, 2021; and, if the council did not find the report demonstrated compliance, the school would be asked to appear before the council at its May, 2021 meeting.  In 2022, the council gave the school a three-year extension for bar pass compliance.

Post-graduation employment
According to the Pontifical Catholic University's 2013 ABA-required disclosures, 4.17% of the Class of 2013 obtained full-time, long-term, JD-required employment nine months after graduation, excluding solo practitioners. The Pontifical Catholic University's Law School Transparency under-employment score is 49.6%, indicating the percentage of the Class of 2013 unemployed, pursuing an additional degree, or working in a non-professional, short-term, or part-time job nine months after graduation, and an unknown score of 32.5%, indicated the percentage of graduates whose employment status was not known.

Notable faculty
 Rafael Hernández Colón - Former Governor of Puerto Rico
 Héctor Luis Acevedo - Former Secretary of State and Mayor of San Juan
 Alfredo J. Mora - Former adjutant general of the Puerto Rico National Guard 
 Charles Cuprill Oppenheimer - Past Rotary District Governor, Retired Mayor General, Puerto Rico National Guard. Served 3 times as Dean of the Law School. One of the Founders of Ponce School of Medicine.  Two time president of Phi Sigma Alpha and "Hermano Emeritus" Medal holder of the Fraternity.

Notable alumni
 Efraín Rivera Pérez - Associate Judge of the Supreme Court of Puerto Rico (retired)
 Aida Delgado - United States magistrate judge and then district judge of the United States District Court for the District of Puerto Rico
 Antonio Fas Alzamora - Puerto Rico Senator, former President of the Senate of the Commonwealth of Puerto Rico.
 Carmelo Ríos Santiago - Senator PNP/Bayamón
 José Emilio González Velázquez - Former Senator PNP/Arecibo, Superior Court Judge
 Deborah Seilhamer - athlete and daughter of Senator Larry Seilhamer
 Carlos Vargas Ferrer - Representative PPD/District 29 Cidra-Cayey House of Representatives of Puerto Rico

Student organizations
 Student Council
 Federal Bar Association
 Phi Alpha Delta Law Fraternity
 Phi Sigma Alpha fraternity
 Nu Sigma Beta fraternity
 American Bar Association
 Organización Pro-Derecho de la Mujer - Pro-female Rights Organization
 The Federalist Society
 Phi Eta Mu fraternity
 Delta Theta Phi Law Fraternity International
 Educca
 Prima Facie - Student Newspaper
 Tuna de la Escuela de Derecho - University Tuna
 Asociacion de Notarios de Puerto Rico / Capítulo Estudiantil
 Association of Trial Lawyers of America
 American Association of Trial Lawyers.
 APMA-Asociación para la Prevención del Maltrato de Animales 
 Sports & Entertainment Law Students Association
 Revista de Derecho Puertorriqueño

See also

 Pontifical Catholic University of Puerto Rico at Mayagüez
 Ponce School of Medicine

References

External links
 Pontifical Catholic University of Puerto Rico School of Law (Spanish language)

Law schools in Puerto Rico
Catholic law schools in the United States
Catholic universities and colleges in Puerto Rico
Educational institutions established in 1961
Universities and colleges in Ponce, Puerto Rico
1961 establishments in Puerto Rico
Pontifical Catholic University of Puerto Rico
Education in Ponce, Puerto Rico